Reni Santoni (April 21, 1938 – August 1, 2020) was an American film, television and voice actor. He was noted for playing Poppie on the television sitcom Seinfeld, Tony Gonzales in Cobra, and Chico González in Dirty Harry.

Early life
Santoni was born in New York City on April 21, 1938. His family was of Corsican and Spanish descent. He began his career in Off-Broadway theatre, writing the play Raisin' Hell in the Son which premiered in 1962. Reni is short for Renaldo.

Career
Santoni's first significant film role was an uncredited appearance in the 1964 film The Pawnbroker (starring Rod Steiger), in which he played a junkie trying to sell a radio to the title character (using anti-Semitic slurs to no effect). His first leading role was as a young actor in Enter Laughing. He was cast into the role of delivery boy David Kolowitz after being scouted by Carl Reiner; the film was a semi-autobiographical story about the latter. Santoni went on to play Inspector "Chico" González in the 1971 film Dirty Harry. His character, who is a newcomer detective and college graduate in sociology, was initially dismissed by the title character as "a college boy". He ultimately uttered the memorable phrase, "No wonder they call him Dirty Harry; [he] always gets the shit end of the stick".

Santoni again collaborated with Reiner in the comedic homage to film noir Dead Men Don't Wear Plaid (1982). His other film roles during this decade included prison official Ramon Herrera in Bad Boys (1983), as well as Detective Tony Gonzales in the action film Cobra (1986) opposite Sylvester Stallone. He featured in the short-lived series Sanchez of Bel Air and Manimal, in which he played Nick Rivera. He was described by Tracy Newman as having a completely different personality from the characters he played, which were most frequently cops, crime lords, or judges. She noted his reputation among friends as being "the funniest guy in the room".

Santoni made guest appearances on television shows such as Barnaby Jones, Lou Grant, Hawaii Five-O, Hardcastle and McCormick, Hill Street Blues, The Odd Couple and Midnight Caller. In 1973, Santoni played a junior partner on Owen Marshall: Counselor at Law. His most notable later role was as Poppie, the bombastic, antiabortion, neurotic, and very unhygienic restaurateur in Seinfeld.

Personal life
Santoni was married to Lisa James. He then had a long-term relationship with actress and director Betty Thomas, and a son named Nick.

Death
Santoni died on August 1, 2020, at a hospice in Los Angeles at the age of 82. He had several health problems during his last years, including cancer.

Partial filmography

Sources:

 Strangers in the City (1962) – Scrounge
 The Pawnbroker (1964) – Junkie Selling Radio
 Enter Laughing (1967) – David Kolowitz
 A Great Big Thing (1968) – Vinny Shea
 Anzio (1968) – Pvt. Movie
 Guns of the Magnificent Seven (1969) – Max
 The Student Nurses (1970) – Victor Charlie
 The Odd Couple (1970) – (season 1 Episode 15) Ernie Wilson, the football player
 Dirty Harry (1971) – Inspector Chico Gonzalez
 I Never Promised You a Rose Garden (1977) – Hobbs
 They Went That-A-Way & That-A-Way (1978) – Billy Joe
 Hawaii Five-O (1978) Episode: "A Death in the Family" – Jimmy Rego
 Dead Men Don't Wear Plaid (1982) – Carlos Rodriguez
 Bad Boys (1983) – Ramon Herrera
 Brewster's Millions (1985) – Vin Rapelito
 Radioactive Dreams (1985) – 'Red' Hairstylist / Adult Harold
 Summer Rental (1985) – Announcer
 Cobra (1986) – Sergeant Tony Gonzales
 The Pick-up Artist (1987) – Man in Train Station
 Bright Lights, Big City (1988, voice)
 The Package (1989) – Chicago Police Lieutenant
 Cat Chaser (1989) – Narrator (voice, uncredited)
 Men Don't Tell (1992) – Rueben the Bartender
 Groundhog Day (1993) – voice of State Trooper
 The Brady Bunch Movie (1995) – Police Officer
 The Late Shift (1996) – John Agoglia
 Private Parts (1997) – Vallesecca
 Can't Hardly Wait (1998) – Cop
 Dr. Dolittle (1998) – voice of Rat #1
 28 Days (2000) – Daniel
 Dr. Dolittle 2 (2001) – voice of Rat #1
 Kingpin (2003, mini series) – General Valdez
 Gang Warz (2004) – Father Luis
 Irene in Time (2009) – Sam

TV series

 Miami Vice ("Badge of Dishonor") – Lt. Arturo Dominguez
 The Odd Couple ("The Hideaway") – Ernie Wilson
 CHiPs S5 - E25 (Overload) Computer thief - 1 episode (1982)
 Murder, She Wrote - 2 episodes (1989, 1994)
 NYPD Blue (1995-1996, 3 episodes) - Det. Archie Solomon, Sal Campisi
 Seinfeld (1994 - 1998, 5 episodes) - Poppie
 Grey’s Anatomy (2005) - Alan Griswold

References

External links

1938 births
2020 deaths
Hispanic and Latino American male actors
American male film actors
American male television actors
American male voice actors
American people of Corsican descent
American people of Italian descent
American people of Spanish descent
Male actors from New York City